A pram or pramm describes a type of shallow-draught flat-bottomed ship, usually propelled by pushing the ship through the water using a long pole, although sailing prams also exist. The name pram derives from the Latin premere ("press [verb]").

Historically, prams were often used to transport agricultural cargo or cattle through shallow canals and wetlands in Europe. During the times of the Great Northern War, those types of watercraft were used as a floating battery for artillery support during amphibious assault.

There is also an unrelated type of boat called "pram".

Gallery

See also 
 Hull
 Watercraft

References

Further reading 
  Aeloude en Hedendaegse Scheepsbouw en Bestier Amsterdam 1671.b (In archaic Dutch)
  Schepen die verdwijnen 1947. (In Dutch)
  Nederlandsche binnenschepen 1944. (In Dutch)

External links 

Ship types